Low-functioning autism (LFA) is a degree of autism marked by difficulties with social communication and interaction, challenging behavior, and differences in social or emotional reciprocity. Sleep problems, aggression, stereotypical, and self-injurious behavior are also common symptoms. LFA is not a recognized diagnosis in the DSM-5 or ICD-10, as neither subdivides autism based on intellectual capabilities.

Other terms include Kanner's syndrome, Kannerian autism (both named after Leo Kanner), and classic autism. The terms overlap with severe autism and profound autism, as opposed to mild or moderate, which do not necessarily correlate with severe and profound levels of intellectual disability, where profound is the most severe level.

Characterization
Those who display symptoms for LFA usually have "impairments in all the three areas of psychopathology: reciprocal social interaction, communication, and restricted, stereotyped, repetitive behaviour".

Severe impairment of social skills can be seen in people with LFA. This could include a lack of eye contact, inadequate body language and a lack of emotional or physical response to others' behaviors and emotions. These social impairments can cause difficulty in relationships.

Communication impairments shown in people with LFA include lack of communication (both oral communication – i.e. nonverbal autism – and body language), repetitive use of words or phrases, and lack of imaginative play skills. They also may respond only to very direct external social interaction from others. Specific behavioral impairments that may be exhibited by a person with LFA include adherence to nonfunctional rituals or routines, repetitive motor functions such as hand flapping or complex whole body movements, and restrictive or obsessive patterns of interest that are abnormal. Other symptoms may include preoccupation with sensory elements of play materials such as their odor, feel, or noise they generate.

Behaviour 
An association between high-functioning autism (HFA) and criminal behavior is not completely characterized. Several studies have shown that the features associated with HFA may increase the probability of engaging in criminal behavior. It is unclear if the results from these studies on HFA can be extrapolated to LFA.

Causes
The exact causes of autism are unknown, but it is believed that both genetic and environmental factors play a role in its development. Multiple studies have shown structural and functional abnormalities in the brains of autistic people. Experiments have been conducted to determine if the degree of brain abnormality yields any correlation to the severity of autism. One study done by Elia et al. (2000) used magnetic resonance imaging (MRI) on the midsagittal area of the cerebrum, midbrain, cerebellar vermis, corpus callosum, and vermal lobules VI and VII to measure brain abnormalities in children with low-functioning autism. The results suggested that the midbrain structures correlate with certain developmental behavioral aspects such as motivation, mnemonic, and learning processes, though there is more research needed to confirm this. Furthermore, many developmental processes may contribute to several types of brain abnormalities in autism; therefore, determining the link between such abnormalities and severity of autism proves difficult.

Diagnosis

While low-functioning autism has never been an official diagnosis in the Diagnostic and Statistical Manual of Mental Disorders published by the American Psychiatric Association, it was a classification in the DSM-4 to refer to someone with autism who has an intellectual disability (an IQ of 69 or below). But in the present diagnostic standards in the DSM-5, the classification of LFA has been removed.

The criteria for autism spectrum disorders in the DSM-5 is broken down into three levels of support required, the criteria for level 3 (requiring very substantial support) includes severe deficits in communication skills (verbal and nonverbal), inflexibility of behavior, extreme difficulty coping with change, and extreme difficulty with shifting focus and attention. Individuals with level 3 autism would initiate very limited amounts of social interactions and would respond only to direct social approaches from others.

The ICD-10 criteria for childhood autism postulate that abnormal or impaired development is evident before the age of 3 in receptive or expressive language used in social communication, development of selective social attachments or reciprocal social interactions, or functional and symbolic play. The children would also be required to exhibit six other symptoms from three macro-categories pertaining to qualitative impairment in social interactions, quantitative abnormalities in communication, and restricted/repetitive/stereotyped patterns of behavior, interests, and activities. ICD-10 differentiates high functioning and low-functioning autistic people by diagnosing the additional code of intellectual disability.

Therapy

Augmentative and alternative communication 
Augmentative and alternative communication (AAC) is used for autistic people who cannot communicate orally. People who have problems speaking may be taught to use other forms of communication, such as body language, computers, interactive devices, and pictures. The Picture Exchange Communication System (PECS) is a commonly used form of augmentative and alternative communication with children and adults who cannot communicate well orally. People are taught how to link pictures and symbols to their feelings, desires and observation, and may be able to link sentences together with the vocabulary that they form.

Speech-language therapy

Speech-language therapy can help those with autism who need to develop or improve communication skills. According to the organization Autism Speaks, "speech-language therapy is designed to coordinate the mechanics of speech with the meaning and social use of speech". People with low-functioning autism may not be able to communicate with spoken words. Speech-language pathologists (SLP) may teach someone how to communicate more effectively with others or work on starting to develop speech patterns. The SLP will create a plan that focuses on what the child needs.

Occupational therapy
Occupational therapy helps autistic children and adults learn everyday skills that help them with daily tasks, such as personal hygiene and movement. These skills are then integrated into their home, school, and work environments. Therapists will oftentimes help people learn to adapt their environment to their skill level. An occupational therapist will create a plan based on a person's needs and desires and work with them to achieve their set goals.

Sensory integration therapy

Sensory integration therapy helps people with autism adapt to different kinds of sensory stimuli. Many with autism can be oversensitive to certain stimuli, such as lights or sounds, causing them to overreact. Others may not react to certain stimuli, such as someone speaking to them. Therapists will create a plan that focuses on the type of stimulation the person needs integration with.

Applied behavioral analysis (ABA)

Applied behavioral analysis (ABA) is considered the most effective therapy for autism spectrum disorders by the American Academy of Pediatrics. ABA focuses on teaching adaptive behaviors like social skills, play skills, or communication skills and diminishing problematic behaviors like eloping or self-injury by creating a specialized plan that uses behavioral therapy techniques such as positive or negative reinforcement to encourage or discourage certain behaviors over-time.

Medication 

There are no medications specifically designed to treat autism. Medication is usually used for the individual symptoms of autism, such as aggression, depression, anxiety, or attention problems. Medicines are usually used after other alternative forms of treatment have failed.

Criticism of functioning labels

See also
 High-functioning autism
 Nonverbal autism, often associated with low functioning

References

Autism spectrum disorders